Paul Niehans (21 November 18821 September 1971) was a Swiss surgeon, specialising in regenerative medicine,  who was one of the developers of a cellular therapy called the Niehans method or fresh cell therapy. His renown grew through his treatment of state leaders and celebrities such as Pope Pius XII, King Ibn Saud, Konrad Adenauer and Charlie Chaplin.

Biography

Early life
Paul Niehans, the son of a doctor, was born in Bern. He first studied theology, but quickly grew dissatisfied with religious life and took up medicine. He first studied at Bern, then completed an internship in Zürich. Niehans joined the Swiss Army in 1912.

Medical career
When war broke out in the Balkans, Niehans set up a hospital in Belgrade, Yugoslavia. Intrigued with Alexis Carrel's experiments, Niehans specialized in glandular transplants and by 1925 was one of the leading glandular surgeons in Europe. In 1931, Niehans treated a patient suffering from tetany whose parathyroid had been erroneously removed by another physician. Too weak for a glandular transplant, the patient was given injections of the parathyroid glands of steer, and she soon recovered.

In 1937, influenced by the work of  the neurosurgeon Harvey Williams Cushing, Niehans first  used  cerebral cells, from the  hypothalamus and  the hypophysis. Beginning in 1948, he also used liver, pancreas, kidney, heart, duodenum, thymus, and spleen cells. In 1949, he began to use  lyophilized (freeze-dried) cells, not only fresh ones. In 1953, Paul Niehans treated Pope Pius XII, who in gratitude appointed him member of the Papal Academy of Sciences. In the United States, it is not legally available because of safety concerns and lack of proof of its effectiveness.

Fresh cell therapy

Fresh cell therapy (also known as cellular therapy or live cell therapy), developed in the 1930s by Niehans, involves harvesting fresh cells from sheep (New Zealand Black Sheep, is the breed he used) embryo and injecting them directly (intramuscular) into the person’s buttocks. There is no evidence it is useful for any health problem. There have been several instances of severe adverse effects including death.

Niehans promoted fresh cell therapy as a cancer treatment. In 1963, the American Cancer Society investigated and found "no evidence that treatment with the Fresh Cell Therapy or "CT" results in any objective benefit in the treatment." Fresh cell therapy is considered an unproven method of cancer treatment and quackery by medical experts.

References

Sources

 
Gilles Lambert. (1959). Conquest of Age: The Extraordinary Story of Dr. Paul Niehans. Rinehart.
 E. Wolff: Vor 50 Jahren: Paul Niehans bringt den Begriff «Zellulartherapie» in die Öffentlichkeit. In: Schweizerische Ärztezeitung / Bulletin des médecins suisses / Bollettino dei medici svizzeri. 2002;83: Nr 32/33, S. 1726f. (Text als pdf-Datei)

External links 
 Biography at the Paul Niehans Laboratories Health Center, Germany
 Clinique Paul Niehans in Switzerland

1882 births
1971 deaths
Alternative cancer treatment advocates
Scientists from Bern
20th-century Swiss physicians
Swiss surgeons
20th-century surgeons